Snap general elections were held in Grenada on 23 June 2022. The incumbent Prime Minister Keith Mitchell sought a sixth term. National Democratic Congress (NDC) made a return to parliament after nine years of absence, defeating the ruling party New National Party (NNP), which led to Dickon Mitchell becoming the new prime minister of Grenada. This is also the first election since 2008 where the NDC gained seats.

Background

During the previous election held in March 2018, the NNP, led by prime minister Keith Mitchell, was re-elected to a fifth term. Like in the 2013 election, the NNP won all 15 seats in the house of representatives.

Three months after the 2018 election, NDC leader Nazim Burke resigned, and deputy leader Joseph Andall acted as party leader in the interim. Former education minister Franka Bernardine was elected unopposed at the next party convention in November.  She resigned in November 2020 due to health reasons, with deputy leader Adrian Thomas taking charge in the interim period.  The NDC reconvened in October 2021 to elect new party executives; the party chose attorney Dickon Mitchell (no relation) to lead the NDC, with Adrian Thomas as deputy leader.

Electoral system
The 15 members of the House of Representatives are elected by first-past-the-post voting in single-member constituencies.

Conduct 

Prime minister Mitchell advised the governor-general, Dame Cécile La Grenade, to dissolve the house of representatives on 16 May, one year earlier than the full five years term of the outgoing house. La Grenade issued a writ for the election the following day. In the short time between the election announcement and the issue of the writ, citizens only had one day to register to vote if they had not done so already. Candidate nominations occurred on 1 June. Police officers voted on 20 June.

The Caribbean Community and the Organization of American States sent delegations to observe the election. The prime minister assured that the presence of both observer missions provided "transparency and confidence to the electoral process".

Candidates 
41 candidates were nominated for this election, with five participating parties and one independent candidate.  The New National Party (NNP) and the National Democratic Congress (NDC) nominated candidates for all 15 seats. The Grenada United Labour Party (GULP) nominated 4 candidates, while the Independent Freedom Party (IFP) and the Grenada Renaissance Party (GRP) nominated 3 each.

Slogans and manifestos

Results

By constituency

Aftermath

Outgoing prime minister Keith Mitchell called Dickon Mitchell to congratulate him on his electoral triumph. At the same time, he urged the incoming prime minister to consider preserving programs implemented by the NNP government, which he said delivered a significant benefit to ordinary Grenadians. Keith Mitchell, who became opposition leader, vowed to provide the new government with a productive opposition and insisted it would be "nothing personal". Dickon Mitchell was sworn in as prime minister on 24 June 2022.

Mitchell was congratulated by foreign leaders, including Cuban president Miguel Díaz-Canel and the prime minister of St. Vincent and the Grenadines, Ralph Gonsalves.

References

2022 elections in the Caribbean
2022
June 2022 events in North America